University Nord was a private university in Tallinn, Estonia, established in 1991. In 2010 it joined the University of Tallinn.

See also
 List of universities in Estonia

References

Universities and colleges in Estonia
Education in Tallinn
Educational institutions established in 1991
1991 establishments in Estonia